Baláže is a village and municipality of the Banská Bystrica District in the Banská Bystrica Region of Slovakia.

History
In historical records, the village was first mentioned in 1529 (1529 Huttae Lyptyczae, 1531 Lyptzcicz, 1540 Lypschersaifen), when it belonged to a certain citizen Kolmann from Banská Bystrica. Later, it was sold to Lang, Glocknitzer, Petermann and Königsberger. From 1469 to 1546 it belonged to the noble family of Thurzo and the rich merchants Fuggers.

Genealogical resources

The records for genealogical research are available at the state archive "Statny Archiv in Banska Bystrica, Slovakia"

 Roman Catholic church records (births/marriages/deaths): 1658-1786 (parish C), 1787-1896 (parish B)
 Census records 1869 of Balaze are not available at the state archive.

See also
 List of municipalities and towns in Slovakia

References

External links

 
Surnames of living people in Balaze

Villages and municipalities in Banská Bystrica District